Neend Hamari Khwab Tumhare may refer to:
 Neend Hamari Khwab Tumhare (1966 film), an Indian Hindi-language film
 Neend Hamari Khwab Tumhare (1971 film), a Pakistani Urdu-language film